El Heraldo de México Awards were given annually by the newspaper El Heraldo de México to honor the best professionals in advertising, television, radio, theatre, film, music and sports.

History 
The first ceremony was held on January 15, 1966, since then they were held annually until 2003. The awards were founded by Raúl Velasco. The ceremony was televised by Televisa.

Categories 
Several awards for: 

Film
Television
Theater
Music
Radio
Advertising
Sports

Special categories: 

The promise of El Heraldo
The face of El Heraldo
The voice of El Heraldo

References

External links 
2001 Nominations

Awards established in 1966
Mexican awards
Mexican film awards